{{DISPLAYTITLE:C8H5NO6}}
The molecular formula C8H5NO6 may refer to:

 Berberonic acid
 Collidinic acid
 3-Nitrophthalic acid
 4-Nitrophthalic acid
 5-Nitroisophthalic acid
 4-(Nitrooxy)carbonyl benzoic acid